Berthellina quadridens is a species of sea slug, a marine gastropod mollusc in the family Pleurobranchidae.

Distribution
Distribution of Berthellina quadridens includes Mexico, Belize, Colombia, Costa Rica, Panama, Venezuela, Aruba, Curaçao, Haiti, Jamaica, Puerto Rico, Virgin Islands, Sint Maarten, St. Lucia, Guadeloupe, Martinique, Barbados, St. Vincent and the Grenadines, Grenada, Trinidad and Tobago, Brazil.

The type locality is Saint Thomas, U.S. Virgin Islands.

Description
Body is oval, inflated. Dorsum is smooth covering the internal shell, which is located over the anterior portion of the viscera. Anterior end of the body is with a large oral veil. Rhinophores are rolled emerging between the veil and the dorsum. Color is yellow to orange, semi-translucent. It is up to 25 mm long. Welch (2010) listed that the maximum recorded length is 80 mm.

Ecology

Minimum recorded depth is 0 m. Maximum recorded depth is 50 m.

It possibly feeds on sponges and likely on the corals Orbicella faveolata and Orbicella annularis as well as on anemones.

References
This article incorporates Creative Commons (CC-BY-4.0) text from the reference

External links 

Pleurobranchidae
Gastropods described in 1863